Peterhouse School may be referring to
Peterhouse Boys' School, in Mashonaland East, Zimbabwe
Peterhouse Girls' School, in Mashonaland East, Zimbabwe
Peterhouse school of history